Bhojraj Joshi is a Nepalese politician, belonging to the Communist Party of Nepal (Unified Marxist-Leninist). He was elected to the Pratinidhi Sabha in the 1994 election. In 1997 he was named Minister of Education in the cabinet of Lokendra Bahadur Chand.

In 2005 he was arrested during pro-democracy protests.

References

Government ministers of Nepal
Living people
Communist Party of Nepal (Unified Marxist–Leninist) politicians
Year of birth missing (living people)
People of the Nepalese Civil War
Nepal MPs 1994–1999